Ajou Motor College, formerly Daecheon College, is a private technical college in Boryeong, near the seacoast of South Chungcheong province, South Korea.  It employs about 100 instructors. The president is Pyongwan Park.

Academics
Academic offerings are divided between the division of Automotive Machinery and that of Internet Information (which also includes departments such as cuisine and leisure studies).

History
The college opened in 1995 as Daecheon Technical College (대천전문대학).  It was established by the Daewoo Educational Foundation, which is affiliated with the Daewoo conglomerate.  At the time, training was provided for about 400 students in automotive and electronic fields.  The current school name was adopted in September 2004.

 1997: Daewoo Academy was founded
 1991: Establishment of Daecheon Technical College approved
 1995: First matriculation ceremony
 1996: Completed the construction of the automobile production practice area (720m²) and the dormitory (3,170m²)
 1997: Completed the construction of Automobile Practice Building A (720m²), Automobile Practice Building B (1,040m²), and Student Welfare Building (291m²). Selected as an excellent engineering college and appointed as a college specialized in the automotive production and technology by the Ministry of Education, Science and Technology. Appointed as a trail college for connection operation of the 2+2 curriculum by the Ministry of Education, Science and Technology
 1998: Selected as an excellent college by the College General Assessment conducted by the Ministry of Education, Science and Technology
 1999: Construction of the Common Practice of Automotive Production Technology and Research Center (3,488m²) completed
 2001: Appointed as Business Incubator Center by the Small and Medium Business Administration
 2002: Designated as a certified institute for the British national technical certification, the VRQs3
 2003: Established the College of Mold in the Bucheon Techno Park Industrial Complex under the agreement between the Bucheon Mold Association and Daecheon College
 2004: Changed the school name to Ajou Motor College
2005: Opened an educational training center in Australia
2006: Completed the construction of the practice area for car frame repair (3,293m²)
2009: Selected for the fostering project of the academic-industrial cooperation-oriented college
2010: Completed the sports complex with artificial grass (8,699m²). Selected for the college brand project conducted by the Ministry of Education, Science and Technology (automobile field)
2011: Selected as a college with excellent educational capacity by the Ministry of Education, Science and Technology. Selected for the college brand project for two consecutive years conducted by the Ministry of Education, Science and Technology (automobile field). Selected as a leading college for fostering customized human resources for small and medium-sized companies conducted by the Small and Medium Business Administration. Signed an agreement of exchange program with Ajou University
2012: Certified college of educational quality by the College General Assessment of the Ministry of Education, Science and Technology

See also
Education in South Korea
List of colleges and universities in South Korea

References

External links
Official school website, in Korean
Official school website, in English

Vocational education in South Korea
Universities and colleges in South Chungcheong Province